The Seven-Faceted Blessing (berakha aḥat me‘en sheva‘) is a blessing recited in the Jewish liturgy of Friday evenings. It is similar to the out-loud repetition of the Amidah, which is recited in each daytime prayer. On typical evenings, the Amidah is recited only silently, with no out-loud repetition, but on Friday nights, in honor of the Sabbath, the Seven-Faceted Blessing is recited as an abbreviated repetition.

As the normal Sabbath Amidah prayer contains seven blessings, the Seven-Faceted Blessing contains a condensed version of the themes in these seven blessings. The Seven-Faceted Blessing begins with the beginning of the text of the first blessing of the Amidah; continues with the paragraph “Magen Avot” (מגן אבות), which summarizes the themes of all seven blessings of the Sabbath Amidah; and concludes with a paragraph about the sanctity of the sabbath, and a concluding sentence: "Blessed are You, O Lord, who sanctifies the Sabbath."

The Seven-Faceted Blessing is recited every Friday evening of the year, even if it coincides with a festival or Yom Kippur. This is in contrast to most of the Sabbath liturgy, which is jettisoned if a particular Sabbath falls on a festival or on Yom Kippur. 

In the Eastern Ashkenazic rite and in most Sephardic communities, this blessing is omitted on the first night of Passover, because that is considered a "time of protection"; in the Western Ashkenazic rite as well as many Chasidic communities, it is recited as normal.

The text of the Seven-Faceted Blessing (in accordance with the Ashkenazic version—other traditions have very similar versions—can be found in Seder Avodat Yisra’el on pp. 190–191. The text used in most Western Sephardic Communities can be found in "Seder Tefilah" of Mantua.

In medieval Europe, it was fairly common for congregations to insert special poems, called Magen Avot piyyutim, into the middle of this blessing; while this is less common today, some Western Ashkenazic communities (such as Khal Adath Jeshurun) recite such a piyyut when the second night of Shavuot falls on the Sabbath.

References

Jewish prayer and ritual texts
Jewish blessings
Maariv
Shabbat prayers